The Coalition For Women In Journalism (CFWIJ) is a New York-based non-profit organization that functions globally. The organization is supported by Craig Newmark Philanthropies.

Background 
The Coalition For Women In Journalism, also known as The Coalition or CFWIJ, is a support organization for female journalists from around the globe. It was founded by Pakistani journalist Kiran Nazish in 2017 as a pro-bono organization and launched as an NGO in 2018. According to Nazish: "Instead of competing with each other in a male-created, male-dominated environment, we want to empower women by empowering each other," Kiran said in an interview. After the launch, CFWIJ became the first not-for-profit to offer mentorship to female journalists in mid-career from western and non-western countries. The Pakistan Chapter for the organization was launched in 2018 with prominent female women journalists.

Mentorship program 
As part of its mentorship program, The Coalition has mentored dozens of women journalists across the world.
Its mentors are divided in three categories - global mentors, mentors based in chapters (Mexico/Latin America and Asia) and #HEFORSHE allies.

Advocacy work 
The Coalition's advocacy work involves rallying for the safety and equality of women journalists both on and off the field. It has been known to focus on cases that sometimes slip the news circuit. 
In November 2018, the organization held a #HearMeToo roundtable in Pakistan, which focused on the gaps in the industry that women journalists had to face. The event looked at whether ‘hard' beats were made inaccessible for women journalists in the industry.
During 2019, the organization seems to have produced a couple of delegations for different issues related to women journalists. One meeting took place in Pakistan in July 2019 with Human Rights minister Shireen Mazari where the government took a clear stance against harassment of women journalists for the first time in the history of the country.

A month later, in July 2019, the organization took another delegation to the Federal Ombudsperson for harassment, Kashmala Tariq, where the two agreed to collaborate to help build a harassment-free work environment for women journalists.

Towards the end of 2019, the organization held a series of events in Turkey, including talks and delegations, focusing on the safety of women journalists. Members of the organization, including founding director Kiran Nazish met with EAK Turkey, took a delegation to government officials with CHP Women's Branch, and conducted a discussion propagating safety for women journalists in collaboration with Turkey's Journalists' Union (TGS).
In October 2019, the organization held a number of talks and discussions at the FELICH festival in Mexico.

JSafe app 
During February 2020, CFWIJ began beta testing a new safety and documentation app for journalists called the JSafe app. It was developed in collaboration with the Reynolds Journalism Institute at the University of Missouri. It took more than a year to develop and is currently available for iPhones. An Android version is also said to be under development.

The app is a part of CFWIJ's advocacy efforts to make journalism safer for women journalists. It helps journalists, especially women journalists, report threats, attacks and abuse that they face on the job. Journalists can ask for a follow up, assistance or look for help through the app, which is provided by the CFWIJ.

References

External links 

 

Professional associations for women